The mvet is a stringed musical instrument, a type of stick zither, Hornbostel-Sachs (311) of the Fang people of Gabon, Cameroon, Democratic Republic of the Congo, São Tomé and Equatorial Guinea. Somewhat resembling the Mande kora, but larger and simpler, it consists of a tubular stick of palm-raffia or bamboo, between one and two metres long, with usually three calabash resonators. A central vertical bridge divides four or five gut or metal strings, played both sides of the bridge.

The instrument is held horizontally on the chest to close or open the central resonator with a movement of the arms. It may be played solo or may accompany song or poetry that includes epics, battle-songs, ritual, philosophy and knowledge of the world.

In the late twentieth century the mvet became a key instrument of bikutsi music.

See also
Bwiti
List of musical instruments of Cameroon
Kinnari vina, an Indian tube zither that shares features with the Mvet, including its vertical bridge

References

External links
Video. Mvet played. Musician talks about his instrument.
 Instrument + photo
 Encyclopaedia of Mvet
  Archived paper submitted to MoneFang.com giving details of the instrument as played by the Fang people.

Gabonese music
Cameroonian music
West African musical instruments
Equatoguinean musical instruments
Harps
Lute family instruments